Amschel is a given name. Notable people with the name include:

Amschel Mayer Rothschild (1773–1855), German Jewish banker of the Rothschild family financial dynasty
Amschel Mayor James Rothschild (1955–1996), youngest child of Victor Rothschild and his second wife
Amschel Moses Rothschild (died 1755), 18th-century German Jewish moneychanger and trader in silk cloth
Mayer Amschel de Rothschild (1818–1874), youngest son of Nathan Mayer Rothschild (1777–1836)
Mayer Amschel Rothschild (1744–1812), the founder of the Rothschild family international banking dynasty
Franz Kafka's Hebrew name was Amschel

Jewish given names
Hebrew-language names